Switzerland County High School is a public high school located in Vevay, Indiana.

History 
The doors of the school were opened in 1968 with the consolidation of the Patriot Trojans and Vevay Warriors. It was established in 1969

Athletics
Switzerland County Senior High School's athletic teams are called the Pacers, and they compete in the Ohio River Valley Conference.

Basketball
The 2015-2016 Men's basketball team went 7-16 overall and lost to North Decatur High School by a score of 61–51 in the semi-finals of the 2015-16 IHSAA Class 2A Boys Basketball State Tournament.

See also
 List of high schools in Indiana

References

External links
 Official Website

Buildings and structures in Switzerland County, Indiana
Schools in Switzerland County, Indiana
Public high schools in Indiana